RK Crvenka is a Serbian handball club based in Crvenka. They compete in the Serbian Handball Super B League.

History
The first handball club in Crvenka was established in 1952. They competed under the name RK Partizan. In 1959, the club merged with local club RK Jedinstvo to form RK Crvenka. They made their Yugoslav Championship debut in 1965. Two years later, the club won its first trophy, capturing the Yugoslav Cup. They achieved their greatest success by winning the national championship in 1969. The club would reach the European Cup semi-finals in the 1969–70 season.

Between 2008 and 2013, the club competed for five seasons in the Serbian Handball Super League. They earned promotion back to the top flight in 2020.

Honours
Yugoslav League
 1968–69
Yugoslav Cup
 1966–67, 1987–88

Sponsorship
During its history, the club has been known by a variety of names due to sponsorship reasons:
 Crvenka Jaffa Panon
 Crvenka Jaffa

Notable players
The list includes players who played for their respective national teams in any major international tournaments, such as the Olympic Games, World Championships and European Championships:

  Novak Bošković
  Dalibor Čutura
  Dragan Marjanac
  Savo Mešter
  Dimitrije Pejanović
  Nebojša Jokić
  Petar Kapisoda
  Predrag Peruničić
  Dragan Škrbić
  Čedomir Bugarski
  Jovica Elezović
  Petar Fajfrić
  Jožef Holpert
  Drago Jovović
  Đorđe Lavrnić
  Slobodan Mišković
  Stjepan Obran
  Radisav Pavićević
  Đurađ Trbojević
  Zlatko Portner
  Rolando Pušnik
  Momir Rnić
  Zoran Živković

Head coaches

  Vlado Štencl
  Milorad Lajić
  Slobodan Mišković
  Đurađ Trbojević (1999/2000)
  Dragan Nišević
  Milorad Lajić
  Svetozar Jovović
  Radosav Kovačević
  Svetozar Jovović
  Igor Desnica (2012)
  Dragan Kukić (2013)
  Radosav Kovačević
  Dragan Kukić
  Vladimir Zejak (2019–present)

References

External links
 RK Crvenka at srbijasport.net 

Crvenka
Handball clubs established in 1952
1952 establishments in Yugoslavia